Hermon is a village in the Yeghegis Municipality of the Vayots Dzor Province in Armenia.

Notable people 
 Hasan Mirza

References

External links 

Populated places in Vayots Dzor Province